"Wag Ka Nang Umiyak" is a song originally recorded by Filipino pop rock band Sugarfree for the band's third studio album Tala-Arawan. It was released in 2007, through EMI Philippines (now known as PolyEast Records).

Background
The song was written by the band's lead vocalist Ebe Dancel. According to Dancel, the song was inspired of someone he knew who easily cries whenever seeing something sad. The song was written in 10 minutes, the fastest song ever written by him.

KZ Tandingan version

In 2014, a version of the song by KZ Tandingan become a theme song of the movie The Trial. The song was released by ABS-CBN Film Productions, Inc. KZ Tandingan received two nominations at the 26th Awit Awards for her performance of the song.

Gary Valenciano version

One year after the released of the version of KZ Tandingan, ABS-CBN Film Productions, Inc. once again released a new version this time by Gary Valenciano. The version of Valenciano has been included in the soundtrack of FPJ's Ang Probinsyano.

This version by Valenciano gained more prominence as the theme of the action drama series FPJ's Ang Probinsyano starring Coco Martin. The theme would go on to be the subject of Internet memes and would later be dubbed the pambansang theme song.

Usage in other media
Later, it was used for the Maalaala Mo Kaya episode Plano featuring the life of PS/Insp. Garry Erana, one of the casualties of the Mamasapano clash, which starred Coco Martin and Angel Locsin.

Notes

References

2006 songs
2015 singles
Tagalog-language songs